Guzmania bipartita is a plant species in the genus Guzmania. This species is native to Peru, Bolivia and Ecuador.

References

bipartita
Flora of South America
Plants described in 1959